Jean "Janne" Cronstedt (born 6 October 1932) is a Swedish former gymnast. He competed in eight events at the 1960 Summer Olympics. After his sports career, Cronstedt worked as a physician in Sweden, South Africa and Saudi Arabia.

Early life
Cronstedt was born into the Swedish-speaking Finnish  in Helsinki, Finland. His paternal grandfather  (né Galindo) was the CEO of the Union Bank of Finland, and through him Cronstedt is partly of Spanish descent. In 1940, during World War II, he was sent to Sweden as a Finnish war child. He later returned to Helsinki and went to study in the United States. Cronstedt later moved to Sweden and acquired Swedish citizenship.

References

External links
 

1932 births
Living people
Swedish male artistic gymnasts
Olympic gymnasts of Sweden
Gymnasts at the 1960 Summer Olympics
Sportspeople from Helsinki
Finnish emigrants to Sweden
Finnish refugees
Refugees in Sweden
Swedish expatriates in Saudi Arabia
Swedish expatriates in South Africa
Swedish people of Finnish descent
Swedish people of Spanish descent
Swedish-speaking Finns
Finnish people of Spanish descent
Penn State Nittany Lions men's gymnasts